Emilia Schneider Videla (born 23 October 1996) is a Chilean feminist, activist, and politician. In the 2021 Chilean general election, she was elected to the Chamber of Deputies of Chile with the left-wing Commons party. She is the first openly transgender person to be elected to the Chamber of Deputies.

Career 
She previously served as president of the University of Chile Student Federation, where she was a local leader in the 2019–2021 Chilean protests.

Personal life 
She is the great-granddaughter of René Schneider, the former Commander-in-chief of the Chilean Army and opponent of a coup d'état against Salvador Allende until his assassination by CIA-backed factions in the Chilean military.

References 

Living people
1996 births
People from Santiago
Members of the Chamber of Deputies of Chile
Commons (political party) politicians
Chilean LGBT politicians
Chilean transgender people
Transgender politicians
Transgender women
LGBT legislators
Chilean people of German descent